The Delphic Fraternity, Inc., also known as Delphic of Gamma Sigma Tau, is a historic multicultural fraternity originally founded in New York State in 1871 and re-established in 1987. The fraternity can trace its origin back to the Delphic Society founded in 1850.

History 
The Delphic Society was founded on October 13, 1871, at the Geneseo State Normal School (SUNY Geneseo) in upstate New York. It was a successor organization to the Delphic Society at Rochester, which had been active until at least December 1866.

With affiliations at other schools, the college literary society at Geneseo became known as the Delphic Fraternity.

Delphic eventually became a regional fraternity with chapters at Oneonta, Jamaica, Cortland, New Paltz, Plattsburgh, and Potsdam, New York, and Mansfield, Pennsylvania. The oldest chapter, at SUNY Cortland, traces its formation back to the Cortland Academy Debating Club in 1842.
 
By the late 1930s, only the Zeta chapter at the State Teachers College at New Paltz (SUNY New Paltz) remained active. In the early 1950s, the chapter became briefly associated with Sigma Tau Gamma, a larger national fraternity.

In 1962, the organization became a legal not-for-profit membership entity by incorporating in the state of New York as the Delphic Fraternity of New Paltz, Inc. On March 11, 1987, the fraternity was re-established as Delphic of Gamma Sigma Tau at SUNY New Paltz.

In 2003, the Theta chapter at Binghamton University was founded, becoming the first Delphic chapter established in the 21st century. In 2009, the first Delphic chapter outside of the northeast region was chartered at the University of Virginia. Known as the Kappa chapter of Delphic, this chapter is also the first multicultural fraternity established at UVA.

The Delphic Fraternity, Inc. has one active undergraduate chapter, three active graduate chapters, and three alumni chapters.

Notable alumni 
 Henry Albert Dickinson - New York State Assembly member

References

External links
Delphic of Gamma Sigma Tau Fraternity
Delphic Fraternity History website

Former members of National Multicultural Greek Council
Student organizations established in 1871
Student societies in the United States
1871 establishments in New York (state)